Montgomery Township may refer to:

Arkansas
 Montgomery Township, Hot Spring County, Arkansas, in Hot Spring County, Arkansas

Illinois
 Montgomery Township, Crawford County, Illinois
 Montgomery Township, Woodford County, Illinois

Indiana
 Montgomery Township, Gibson County, Indiana
 Montgomery Township, Jennings County, Indiana
 Montgomery Township, Owen County, Indiana

Minnesota
 Montgomery Township, Le Sueur County, Minnesota

Missouri
 Montgomery Township, Hickory County, Missouri, in Hickory County, Missouri
 Montgomery Township, Montgomery County, Missouri
 Montgomery Township, Wright County, Missouri

New Jersey
 Montgomery Township, New Jersey

Ohio
 Montgomery Township, Ashland County, Ohio
 Montgomery Township, Franklin County, Ohio, now part of the city of Columbus
 Montgomery Township, Marion County, Ohio
 Montgomery Township, Wood County, Ohio

Pennsylvania

 Montgomery Township, Franklin County, Pennsylvania
 Montgomery Township, Indiana County, Pennsylvania
 Montgomery Township, Montgomery County, Pennsylvania

Township name disambiguation pages